Tammaritu may refer to:

 Tammaritu (son of Teumman) (died 653 BCE), King of Elam from 664 to 653 BCE
 Tammaritu I, ruler of Elam from 653 to 652 BCE
 Tammaritu II, ruler of Elam from 652 until 650 or 649 BCE